Elections to Sefton Metropolitan Borough Council were held on 1 May 2003. One third of the council was up for election and the council stayed under no overall control.

After the election, the composition of the council was:
Labour 24
Liberal Democrat 20
Conservative 19
Southport Party 3

Election result

Ward results

References

2003 English local elections
2003
2000s in Merseyside